James, Jamie or Jim Dolan may refer to:

 James Dolan (Lincoln County War) (1848–1898), Old West businessman, cattleman, and key factor in the Lincoln County War
 James Dolan (Wisconsin politician) (1863–1939), American politician
 James Dolan (Irish politician) (1884–1955), Sinn Féin TD from County Leitrim, 1918–1932
 James Dolan (Gaelic footballer), player for Westmeath
 James Dolan (computer security expert) (1981–2017), American computer programmer and security expert
 James H. Dolan (1885–1977), second president of Fairfield University in Connecticut
 James L. Dolan (born 1956), American businessman
 Jamie Dolan (1969–2008), Scottish footballer
 Jim Dolan (canoeist), British slalom canoer
 Jim Dolan (sculptor) (born 1949), American sculptor
 Jim Dolan (Neighbours), a fictional character from the Australian soap opera, Neighbours